Stone State Park is a state park of Iowa, USA, located in the bluffs and ravines adjacent to the Big Sioux River. Stone Park is near the northernmost extent of the Loess Hills, and is at the transition from clay bluffs and prairie to sedimentary rock hills and bur oak forest along the Iowa side of the Big Sioux River. A variety of prairie plants can be found on the steep slopes and ridges, including yucca, penstemon, rough blazing star, silky aster, and pasque flower. Wild turkey, white-tailed deer, coyote, and red fox are found in the park. Birdlife includes the turkey vulture, barred owl, rufous-sided (eastern) towhee, and the ovenbird. Exposed bedrock in the park is composed of lignite, shale, sandstone, and limestone, and dates to the Cretaceous period; it is rich in marine fossils. The park contains many miles of hiking and equestrian trails, and is a popular destination for day visitors, overnight campers, mountain bike enthusiasts, and picnickers.

Mount Talbot State Preserve
The northern part of Stone State Park extending from Woodbury County into Plymouth County is the  Mount Talbot State Preserve. The property, which includes that of the state park, was acquired by Daniel Talbot in 1885. The high grassy ridge where his farm was located became known as Mount Talbot. Biological surveys by The Nature Conservancy and the Iowa Department of Natural Resources were conducted in the 1980s and this section of Stone State Park was dedicated as a biological state preserve in 1989. It features over 75 native plants and 42 species of butterflies.

Dorothy Pecaut Nature Center
The Dorothy Pecaut Nature Center in Sioux City is a destination nature preserve for Woodbury County, and is located within the boundaries of Stone Park. The butterfly garden is unique to the area; wild turkeys and white-tail deer are commonly sighted from the well-marked trails.

References

External links
 Stone State Park
 Dorothy Pecaut Nature Center

State parks of Iowa
Nature centers in Iowa
Protected areas established in 1935
Protected areas of Plymouth County, Iowa
Protected areas of Woodbury County, Iowa
1935 establishments in Iowa